The Colorado School of Mines, informally called Mines, is a public research university in Golden, Colorado, founded in 1874. The school offers both undergraduate and graduate degrees in engineering, science, and mathematics, with a focus on energy and the environment. While Mines does offer minor degrees in the humanities, arts, and social sciences, it only offers major degrees in STEM fields, with the exception of economics. In the Fall 2022 semester, the school had 7,408 students enrolled, with 5,733 in an undergraduate program and 1,675 in a graduate program. The school has been co-educational since its founding, however, enrollment remains predominantly male (68.5% as of Fall 2022). In every QS World University Ranking from 2016 to 2022, the university was ranked as the top institution in the world for mineral and mining engineering. It is classified among "R1: Doctoral Universities – Very high research activity".



History

19th Century 
Golden, Colorado, established in 1859 as Golden City, served as a supply center for miners and settlers in the area. In 1866, Bishop George M. Randall of Massachusetts arrived in the territory and, seeing a need for higher education facilities in the area, began planning for a university which would include a school of mines. In 1870, he opened the Jarvis Hall Collegiate School in the central building of the Colorado University Schools campus just south of the town of Golden, accompanied it with Matthews Hall divinity school in 1872, and in 1873 the School of Mines opened under the auspices of the Episcopal Church. In 1874 the School of Mines, supported by the territorial government since efforts began in 1870, was acquired by the territory and has been a state institution since 1876 when Colorado attained statehood. Tuition was originally free to residents of Colorado.

In 1878, Jarvis Hall’s main building and Matthews Hall were both destroyed by fires in the span of two days. The School of Mines building is the only structure of the complex left standing. Following the fires, the School of Mines enrollment grows, consisting of prospectors and mine owners. A school library is established with $250, and a gymnasium is built to support the growing student body. The school's fight song, "The Mining Engineer", the first two verses of which are still sung today, was established on campus by 1885.

Following the 1880s, the School of Mines transitions to become an 4 year university, removing its assaying certificate program. It is also around this time the colors silver and blue are seen as the school colors. Engineering Hall was completed in 1894. As oldest building on campus, it originally housed the physics and drafting departments, but now houses the Division of Economics and Business. The next year, the CSM Alumni Association is founded with members wearing the first instance of the school's Reuleaux triangle symbol. In 1898, Florence Caldwell became the first female graduate of the School of Mines, earning a Civil Engineering Degree.

20th Century 
At the turn of the century, the School of Mines name is officially changed to the Colorado School of Mines. Simon Guggenheim also donated the largest private donation to the school at the time, $90,000 for the construction of Guggenheim Hall, in honor of his family history in Colorado. The first experimental mine owned by the Colorado School of Mines is built into Mount Zion. Also known as the School Tunnel, it served to train mining engineers and is now incorporated into the basement of a house on the mountain. Also on Mount Zion, the large "M" is constructed based on a senior thesis to make it proportional when viewed from campus. In 1913, due to the large presence of Colorado National Guard's Company A of Engineers in Golden, one of the largest cobblestone buildings constructed in the United States was built near the CSM campus to serve as the Colorado National Guard Armory. The Colorado School of Mines currently has Army and Air Force ROTC programs in the department of military science, although the Armory has since been converted to retail and housing for students.

Colorado School of Mines - University of Denver War 
Tensions between the Colorado School of Mines and University of Denver, locked in a bitter rivalry, boiled over in 1919 when the Orediggers heard of a plot to deface the M. In retaliation to the plot, students from the Colorado School of Mines planted bundles of dynamite on the DU campus which, when detonated in the early morning, blew out windows in many buildings, and cracked the DU administration building. The chancellor of DU stated "“If all the dynamite planted on our campus had exploded simultaneously, it would have knocked down our buildings and destroyed life." Posters were found across the DU campus stating "Get DU and then what? Give 'Em hell Mines." In the evening of the bombing, students left DU with crimson paint, the school colors of the University of Denver, to paint the M. Expecting an response from DU, the Colorado School of Mines had set up a patrols on Mount Zion, and after a brief gunfight, the DU students were captured. No one was injured. The prisoners were kept in the basement of various fraternity houses where their foreheads were branded with silver nitrate in the shape of an M. The students of the School of Mines also lured an Denver Post reporter who was subjected to the same treatment, less the branding, for his supposed slanderous reporting.

The Colorado School of Mines students paraded their prisoners down the streets of Golden, and implemented armed patrols of Mount Zion, claiming the right to search all vehicles for concealed DU students. CSM President, Victor C. Alderson, gave official sanction to the actions of the Colorado School of Mines students, however the Colorado governor, Oliver Shoup asked the schools to seek an truce. Representatives from both schools agreed to an cease and opted for a game of football to settle the conflict. The game was played on a blizzardy day, and resulted in an 0-0 tie. The disgruntled DU students later planted dynamite on the M, but misplacement led to only a small part of the M being damaged. Colorado School of Mines students contemplated kidnapping select DU students to act as the manual labor to repair the M, but it was never seen through due to the grand jury investigation, and the possibility of mutually assured destruction.

In 1921, the Colorado School of Mines bought Edgar Mine in nearby Idaho Springs, Colorado. The experimental mine features an classroom, train, and an extensive network of tunnels. The Colorado School of Mines continues to operate Edgar mine as well as other nearby mines.

The tradition of awarding silver diplomas is started in 1934 by Charles Hull, an Insturment designer at Mines. In 1935, President Herbert Hoover, who is an guest at the commencement ceremonies, is awarded an honorary Doctorate of Engineering for his contribution translating De re metallica from Latin to English. It is also around this time that an Golden local began to bring his burro to football games. The burro quickly became the school mascot, now known as "Blaster the Burro".

Built in 1940, Berthoud Hall opens in honor of Edward L. Berthoud, and early pioneer and advocate for the Colorado School of Mines. Berthoud hall first housed the department of Geophysics, and provided a new space for the Mines Museum of Earth and Science.

University of Colorado Boulder Bell Heist 
Campus legend stated that the bell that used to hang in Guggenheim Hall was stolen by students from the University of Colorado Boulder, and held on their campus. In 1948, an group of mostly GIs decided to return the bell to the Guggenheim Hall. 18 men, all students at the Colorado School of Mines drove to Boulder to case the building and realized the bell was behind a locked door with an night watchman. Returning to Golden empty handed, they went back weeks later with more men to steal the bell. An student who planted themselves inside the building before it closed opened the doors, and they proceeded to lift the 1,200 pound bell onto a dolly out to a truck. The bell was reported stolen by CU, and was said to be their "Old Main" bell. According to the Silver and Gold, CU's newspaper, the bell always belonged to CU. After returning to Golden, the Colorado School of Mines students quickly realized the bell was to big to ever have hung from Guggenheim. They buried it in the clay pits adjacent to campus, and left it for their time at Mines. In 1950, the bell was dug up and placed behind Guggenheim Hall with an M etched into it. The CU administration immediately requested to retrieve the bell, but the CSM administration refused to authorize it until CU provided proof of ownership. 10 days later, CU provided an receipt from the bell caster, and it was returned to be displayed in the CU heritage center with an M clearly on display.

21st Century 

In August 2007, a new student recreation center was completed. In 2008, the school finished expanding its main computer center, the Center for Technology and Learning Media (CTLM). In May 2008 the school completed construction and installation of a new supercomputer nicknamed "Ra" in the CTLM managed by the Golden Energy Computing Organization (GECO), a partnership among the Colorado School of Mines, the National Renewable Energy Laboratory, the National Center for Atmospheric Research and the National Science Foundation. In 2014, CoorsTek granted a $27 million investment to the university, leading to the 2017 opening of the CoorsTek Center for Applied Science and Engineering, a multi-disciplinary building on campus dedicated to both academic and research activities.

Since 1964, the Colorado School of Mines has hosted the annual oil shale symposium, one of the most important international oil shale conferences.  Although the series of symposia stopped after 1992, the tradition was restored in 2006.

Presidents 

Chris Stell. – 1873
Gregory Board – 1875
Milton Moss – 1878
Albert C. Hale – 1880
Regis Chauvenet – 1883
Charles S. Palmer – 1902
Victor C. Alderson – 1903
William G. Haldane – 1913
William B. Phillips – 1915
Howard C. Parmelee – 1916
Victor C. Alderson – 1917

Melville F. Coolbaugh – 1925
Ben H. Parker – 1946
John W Vanderwilt – 1950
Orlo E. Childs – 1963
Guy T. McBride, Jr. – 1970
George S. Ansell – 1984
Theodore A. Bickart – 1998
John U. Trefny – 2000
Myles W. Scoggins – 2006
Paul C. Johnson – 2015

Campus 

Colorado School of Mines is located to the southwest of Golden's downtown, bordered to the west by U.S. Route 6 and to the north by Clear Creek. The campus spans , including over a dozen academic and research buildings, indoor and outdoor athletic facilities, two student centers, a library, eight residential halls, and administration buildings. Additionally, the campus hosts a research building for the United States Geological Survey, housing the National Earthquake Information Center.

The school operates the free admission Mines Museum of Earth Science, which displays rock and mineral specimens collected from Colorado's numerous mining districts as well as around the world. Notable objects in the collection include one of the "Goodwill" Apollo 17 lunar samples and the Miss Colorado crown.

The design of the university's buildings have varied widely over time, spanning a spectrum of styles from Second Empire to Postmodernist, created by noted Colorado architectural masters including Robert S. Roeschlaub (Hall of Engineering), Jacques Benedict (Steinhauer Field House), and Temple Hoyne Buell (Berthoud Hall). To date, three main academic buildings are gone (original Territorial School of Mines, 1871–93; Hall of Chemistry, 1880–1958; Paul Meyer Hall, 1963–2016), while the present campus includes:

Major open-air athletic facilities of the Colorado School of Mines include historic Campbell Field and Darden Field.

The honorary named Colorado School of Mines buildings commemorate Dr. Victor C. Alderson, Edward L. Berthoud, George R. Brown, Dr. Regis Chauvenet, Dr. Melville F. Coolbaugh, Cecil H. and Ida Green, Simon Guggenheim, Nathaniel P. Hill, Arthur Lakes, Dr. Paul D. Meyer, Winfield S. Stratton, and Russell K. Volk.

Academics 

Mines is organized around 16 academic departments and 14 interdisciplinary programs:

Mines began the world's first graduate program in space resources in the fall semester of 2018, offering both master's and PhD degrees.

Rankings

 Tied for 33rd in U.S. News & World Reports 2021 "Top Public Schools" in the U.S.
 42nd in U.S. News & World Report'''s 2021 "Best Engineering Graduate Schools" in the U.S., with the Petroleum Engineering program ranked fourth.
 Tied for 83rd in U.S. News & World Reports 2021 "Best National Universities Rankings".
 83rd out of 174 schools ranked in Kiplinger's Personal Finance'' magazine's 2019 "Best Values in Public Colleges."
 Ninth in "USA Today's Top 10 Engineering Schools 2015".

Admissions

For freshmen entering Fall 2021, Colorado School of Mines received 12,022 applications, accepted 6,838 (56.9%) and enrolled 1,449 (12.1% of those who applied). The middle 50% range of SAT scores for the enrolled freshmen was 650–720 for evidence-based reading, and 660–750 for math, while the ACT Composite range was 29–33. The average GPA was 3.84.  Of the incoming class, 32.7% were women.

Traditions

M Climb 
Freshmen at the Colorado School of Mines are expected, but not required, to participate in the M Climb during orientation weekend. During this climb, students carry a ten-pound rock brought from their hometown up Mt. Zion. Before ascending up the mountain, students are given colored hard-hats which are spray-painted by members of the Blue Key Honor Society.  Along the climb, non-freshmen encourage and heckle the new students with water balloons, silly string, and more, as well as leading the group in learning the Mines' fight song. At the top of the mountain, students place their rock on the "M," a large sign made of rock in the shape of Mines' M logo, and paint the M white using whitewash. On graduation, seniors are invited to take a rock from the M as a keepsake of their time at Mines.

E-Days 
Beginning in 1934, Mines students have celebrated Engineering Days during the spring semester. During E-Days, classes are canceled and students attend a variety of events beginning with the ore cart pull. Students take turns pulling an ore cart down 7.5 miles of Colfax Avenue to the state capitol building, where the governor of Colorado officially declares the start of E-Days. E-Days continues with field events, tech demos, concerts, comedians, manual mining competitions, and a trebuchet contest. The next morning, teams race cardboard boats down Clear Creek, competing to see which team sails the farthest before sinking. A carnival is held during the day, and the Formula SAE club hosts an car show. The evening features more concerts, and an firework show designed in part by the school's pyrotechnics team.

Athletics 

Colorado School of Mines was ranked No. 3 Best NCAA D2 school in the U.S. for student-athletes, according to Next College Student Athlete's 2018 NCSA Power Rankings. The NCSA Power Rankings recognize the best colleges and universities in the U.S. for student-athletes.

In 2022, the Orediggers won their third national title in mens cross country, posting the largest margin of victory in meet history with 143-points. In December, Oredigger football played in their first NCAA Division II national championship in McKinney, Texas, and lost to Ferris State 41-14.

Notable alumni

Notable faculty

See also 

 Colorado lunar sample displays
 List of schools of mines

References
Informational notes

Citations

External links

 
 Mines Athletics Website

 
Public universities and colleges in Colorado
Schools of mines in the United States
Technological universities in the United States
Buildings and structures in Golden, Colorado
Education in Jefferson County, Colorado
Geology of Colorado
Mines in Colorado
Educational institutions established in 1874
1874 establishments in Colorado Territory
Tourist attractions in Golden, Colorado